Los Libertadores University is a university located in Bogotá, Colombia. It was founded in 1982.

References

Universities and colleges in Bogotá
1982 establishments in Colombia
Educational institutions established in 1982